2013 Hockey India League, known as Hero Hockey India League (abbreviated as HIL 2013) was the first season of the hockey tournament Hockey India League. Tournament was scheduled to start from 5 January to 3 February but was postponed to 14 January to 10 February. Each team was composed of 14 Indian and 10 foreign player which were acquired in the auction. A total of 246 players were available for the auction out of which 120 players were bought by the franchises which included 50 foreign and 70 local players.

Delhi Waveriders

Punjab Warriors

Mumbai Magicians

Ranchi Rhinos

Uttar Pradesh Wizards

References

See also
 Hockey India League
 2013 Hockey India League

team rosters
Rosters 2013